Cosmic Chicken is an album by Jack DeJohnette featuring Alex Foster, John Abercrombie, and Peter Warren recorded in 1975 and released on the Prestige label.

Track listing 
All compositions by Jack DeJohnette except where noted.
 "Cosmic Chicken" – 4:53
 "One for Devadip and the Professor" – 3:35
 "Memories" – 5:58
 "Stratocruiser" – 7:28
 "Shades of the Phantom" – 6:13
 "Eiderdown" (Steve Swallow) – 5:35
 "Sweet and Pungent" – 3:32
 "Last Chance Stomp" – 7:07

Personnel 
 Jack DeJohnette – drums, piano, keyboards
 Alex Foster – alto saxophone, tenor saxophone
 John Abercrombie – electric guitar
 Peter Warren – acoustic bass

References 

Jack DeJohnette albums
1975 albums
Prestige Records albums
Albums produced by Orrin Keepnews